Meggitt may refer to :
 Meggitt, a British engineering business specialising in aerospace equipment

 People
 Mervyn Meggitt (1924–2004), an Australian anthropologist and one of the pioneering researchers of highland Papua
 William Meggitt (1894–1927), a British World War I flying ace